Nestlé Tutbury is a large coffee factory in Derbyshire. It is the longest running Nestlé factory in the world, outside of Switzerland.

Nestlé is the world's largest food and drink company. The site is not in Tutbury, but slightly north on the southern edge of Derbyshire.

History
It made powdered milk during World War II.

All of Nestlé's UK and Ireland coffee production was moved to the site in 2014, increasing 400 jobs.

The site was featured on an hour-long BBC Two documentary about coffee production on Tuesday 17 July 2018.

Coffee production
In the 1970s Nestlé had around 50% of the UK coffee production. Nestlé introduced instant coffee to the UK in 1939. Until the late 1980s, most instant coffee in the UK was made with Robusta coffee, and the spray drying process. In 2000, Nestlé had a 56% share of the UK's £650m coffee production.

Nestlé España have Nestlé's largest European coffee factory in Girona (Gerona) in the east of Spain, near the French border.

Visits
The Prime Minister visited the factory on Thursday 24 November 2011, when the site was given £110m of investment.

Structure
The site has around 1000 employees.

Site production
It makes around 175,000 jars of coffee a day. It makes around 35,000 tonnes of coffee a year for the UK and Ireland.

See also

 List of countries by coffee production

References

External links
 Nestlé Tutbury

1901 establishments in England
Buildings and structures in Derbyshire
Coffee production
Economy of Derbyshire
Food manufacturers of England
Industrial buildings completed in 1959
Manufacturing plants in England
Nestlé
South Derbyshire District